Bešnjaja (Serbian Cyrillic: Бешњаја) is a low mountain in central Serbia, lying between the cities of Kragujevac and Jagodina. Its highest peak Lisin laz has an elevation of 613 meters above sea level.

References

Mountains of Serbia
Kragujevac